Kristoffersson, Kristofersson or Kristofferson is a Swedish surname that may refer to
Herman Kristoffersson (1895–1968), Swedish equestrian
Johan Kristoffersson (born 1988), Swedish racecar driver
Kristoffer Kristofferson (born 1936), American singer, songwriter, musician and actor
Kristofer Kristofersson Hjeltnes (1856–1930), Norwegian horticulturist and politician
Tommy Kristoffersson (born 1959), Swedish race car driver, father of Johan
Marcus Kristoffersson (born 1979), Swedish ice hockey right winger 

Swedish-language surnames